The 25th Robert Awards ceremony was held in 2008 in Copenhagen, Denmark. Organized by the Danish Film Academy, the awards honoured the best in Danish and foreign film of 2007.

Honorees

Best Danish Film 
 The Art of Crying – Peter Schønau Fog

Best Children's Film 
 Island of Lost Souls – Nikolaj Arcel

Best Director 
 Peter Schønau Fog – The Art of Crying

Best Screenplay 
  - The Art of Crying

Best Actor in a Leading Role 
 Lars Brygmann – Hvid nat

Best Actress in a Leading Role 
 Noomi Rapace – Daisy Diamond

Best Actor in a Supporting Role 
 Jesper Asholt – The Art of Crying

Best Actress in a Supporting Role 
 Hanne Hedelund – The Art of Crying

Best Cinematography 
 Dan Laustsen – Just Another Love Story

Best Production Design 
 Niels Sejer – Island of Lost Souls

Best Costume Design 
 Margrethe Rasmussen – The Art of Crying

Best Makeup 
 Kamilla Bjerglind – Island of Lost Souls

Best Special Effects 
 Hummer Højmark & Jeppe Nygaard Christensen – Island of Lost Souls

Best Sound Design 
 Hans Christian Kock & Claus Lynge – Island of Lost Souls

Best Editing 
 Anders Villadsen – Just Another Love Story

Best Score 
 Karsten Fundal – The Art of Crying

Best Song 
  - "Lille svale" – Karlas kabale

Best Short Fiction/Animation 
 Boy Meets Girl – Søren Frellesen

Best Long Fiction/Animation 
  – Martin de Thurah

Best Documentary Short 
 Verden i Danmark – Max Kestner

Best Documentary Feature 
 Slobodan Milosevic – Præsident under anklage – Michael Christoffersen

See also 

 2008 Bodil Awards

References

External links 
  

2007 film awards
Robert Awards ceremonies
2008 in Copenhagen